USS Harold E. Holt (FF-1074) was a  of the United States Navy. She was named for Harold Holt, the Prime Minister of Australia, who had disappeared while swimming in December 1967. The ex-Harold E. Holt hulk was sunk as a target during RIMPAC 2002.

Design and description
The Knox class design was derived from the  modified to extend range and without a long-range missile system. They displaced  at full load. Their crew consisted of 13 officers and 211 enlisted men.

The ships were equipped with one Westinghouse geared steam turbine that drove the single propeller shaft.

The Knox-class ships were armed with a 5"/54 caliber Mark 42 gun forward. They mounted an eight-round ASROC launcher between the 5-inch (127 mm) gun and the bridge. Close-range anti-submarine defense was provided by two twin  Mk 32 torpedo tubes. The ships were equipped with a torpedo-carrying DASH drone helicopter; its telescoping hangar and landing pad were positioned amidships aft of the mack. Beginning in the 1970s, the DASH was replaced by a SH-2 Seasprite LAMPS I helicopter and the hangar and landing deck were accordingly enlarged. Most ships also had the 3-inch (76 mm) gun replaced by an eight-cell BPDMS missile launcher in the early 1970s.

Construction and career 
Harold E. Holt was built by Todd Shipyards, Los Angeles Division, San Pedro, California, laid down on 11 May 1968, launched on 3 May 1969 and delivered on 19 March 1971. Harold E. Holt was commissioned 26 March 1971, decommissioned 2 July 1992 and struck 11 January 1995.
Although not scheduled for deployment so soon after commissioning, Harold E. Holt was sent to the Gulf of Tonkin on short notice soon after the North Vietnamese Easter Offensive began in the spring of 1972.  During deployment, she served as PIRAZ escort and provided gunfire support near Quang Tri.  She came under fire a number of times from shore batteries and sustained one mine hit with minor damage.  She returned to Long Beach in late November 1972, and was later awarded a Meritorious Unit Commendation for this deployment.

In May 1975, Harold E. Holt was involved in the Mayaguez incident. During the recapture of the container ship Mayaguez, Marines crossing from Harold E. Holt conducted the first hostile ship-to-ship boarding by the U.S. Navy since 1826.

On 21 March 1984, the   collided with the aircraft carrier  in the Sea of Japan. Kitty Hawk was not significantly damaged but the Soviet submarine could not get underway to proceed home for repairs under her own power. Harold E. Holt stayed on scene for several days before the Soviets could send out a seagoing tug to bring her home. Harold E. Holt offered assistance several times after daybreak but was refused by K-314s captain.

On 10 July 2002, Harold E. Holt was sunk as a target ship as part of the RIMPAC training exercises.

Notes

References

External links 

Navysite.de
NavSource

 

Knox-class frigates
Ships built in Los Angeles
1969 ships
Ships sunk as targets
Cold War frigates and destroyer escorts of the United States